The Cessna 500 Citation I is a small business jet produced by Cessna, the basis of the Citation family.
The Fanjet 500 prototype was announced in October 1968, first flew on September 15, 1969, and was certified as the 500 Citation on September 9, 1971. It was upgraded in 1976 as the Citation I, and the 501 Citation I/SP single-pilot variant was introduced in 1977. Production ended in 1985 with 689 of all variants produced.

The straight wing jet is powered by JT15D turbofans.
The aircraft was developed into the Citation II.

Development

In the early 1960s, the three major American general aviation aircraft manufacturers—Beechcraft, Cessna and Piper–faced a competitive challenge in the form of two newly-developed light business jets, the Learjet 23 and the Aero Commander 1121 Jet Commander, which were much less expensive to buy and operate than previous business jets such as the North American Sabreliner and Hawker Siddeley HS.125. Previous efforts by Beechcraft and Cessna to market small jets had not met with success: the Cessna 407, a proposed civil version of the T-37 Tweet jet trainer, had not proceeded past the mockup stage due to insufficient customer interest, while an effort by Beechcraft to market the Morane-Saulnier MS.760 Paris in North America had ended with only two aircraft sold. However, the runaway success of the Learjet caused the two companies—which only manufactured piston engined aircraft at the time—to reconsider turbine engined aircraft, and Beechcraft launched two simultaneous efforts: the development of the turboprop-powered King Air 90 and an agreement to market the HS.125 in North America.

Cessna quickly found that its premium twin piston-engine aircraft were uncompetitive with the King Air, which was substantially faster, yet could be flown by pilots with similar skills and licensing qualifications. However, the company also saw a broad gap between the King Air and existing light jets such as the Learjet, which were far faster but also relatively unforgiving to fly, requiring highly skilled pilots and long runways. Cessna reasoned that a market existed for a light jet that was faster than the King Air but similarly easy to fly, relatively inexpensive to buy and maintain, and able to access small airports with shorter runways. This type of aircraft would appeal to traditional Cessna buyers: amateur owner-pilots who intend to fly the aircraft themselves.

In October 1968 Cessna announced an eight place business jet capable of operating from airfields accessible to light twins.
The Fanjet 500 prototype first flew on September 15, 1969.
By then its unit cost was $695,000, $M today.
The renamed 500 Citation had a relatively long development program with a longer forward fuselage, repositioned engine nacelles, a larger tail and more dihedral to the horizontal tail.
It was FAA certified on September 9, 1971.

It also gained thrust reversers and higher gross weights.
The enhanced 500 Citation I was introduced later in 1976 with higher weights, JT15D-1A engines and an increased span wing.
The 501 Citation I/SP, certificated for single pilot operations, was delivered in early 1977.
Production ended in 1985, it was developed into the Citation II/Bravo and the Citation V/Ultra/Encore.
Over 690 Citations, Citation Is and I/SPs were built between 1971 and 1985.

By 2018, used 1970s model 500s were valued at $300,000, Citation ISPs at $695,000 to $1.25 million with the Eagle II package.

Design

The aircraft was powered by two Pratt & Whitney Canada JT15D-1 turbofan engines after Cessna's experience with the T-37 Tweet twinjet trainer.
Its use of turbofans rather than turbojets and straight wings rather than swept wings made it cruise slowly compared to other business jets and Learjet salesmen mocked it as the "Nearjet" vulnerable to "bird strikes from the rear"; Cessna renamed it the "Citation" after the thoroughbred but it was nicknamed as "Slowtation".

Operators

Government and Military operators

National Air Force of Angola

Argentine Army
Argentine Federal Police 

People's Liberation Army Air Force

Ecuadorian Navy

Mexican Air Force

Venezuelan Air Force

Accidents and incidents 
Notable accidents and incidents involving the Citation 500, Citation I and Citation I/SP:
 On August 2, 1979, New York Yankees player Thurman Munson was killed when his Citation I/SP, aircraft registration number N15NY, crashed short of the runway during touch-and-go landing practice at Akron-Canton Airport; the crash and post-crash fire destroyed the aircraft while Munson's two passengers escaped with serious injuries. The National Transportation Safety Board (NTSB) attributed the accident to Munson's failure to lower the flaps and maintain adequate airspeed.
 On March 30, 2008, a Citation I/SP, registration VP-BGE, crashed near Biggin Hill Airport, killing former racing drivers David Leslie and Richard Lloyd, the two pilots, and another passenger, and causing a fire that destroyed two houses struck by the aircraft. The accident was attributed to the flight crew's improper emergency procedures in reaction to a perceived engine fault.
 On October 13, 2016, a Citation 500, registration C-GTNG, crashed shortly after takeoff from Kelowna International Airport, killing former Premier of Alberta Jim Prentice, the pilot, and two other passengers. The Transportation Safety Board of Canada (TSB) was unable to conclusively determine the cause of the crash, but the flight profile was consistent with a spiral dive caused by spatial disorientation, and the pilot's lack of experience flying at night and in instrument meteorological conditions were thought to have contributed. The TSB also noted that although the aircraft had been outfitted for single-pilot operations in accordance with Transport Canada (TC) regulations, the operator lacked the required TC approval for single-pilot flights, and the TSB criticized TC for lax operator oversight.
 On May 29, 2021, a Citation 501, registration N66BK, crashed into Percy Priest Lake shortly after takeoff from Smyrna Airport, killing American author Gwen Shamblin Lara and her husband, American actor Joe Lara, along with five other leaders of the Remnant Fellowship Church. The cause of the accident is under investigation by the NTSB.

Specifications (Cessna Citation I)

See also

References

Notes

Bibliography

External links

1960s United States business aircraft
Citation I
Twinjets
Low-wing aircraft
Cruciform tail aircraft
Citation 001
Aircraft first flown in 1969